Hedberg is a Swedish surname. Notable people with the surname include:

Anders Hedberg, Swedish ice hockey player
Frans Hedberg (1828–1908), Swedish playwright and poet
Fredrik Gabriel Hedberg (1811–1893), Finnish Lutheran priest
Hans Hedberg (1917–2007), Swedish sculptor
Hollis Dow Hedberg (1903–1988) American geologist specialising in petroleum exploration
Ingemar Hedberg, Swedish sprint canoer
Johan Erik Hedberg, (1767–1823) Finnish painter
Johan Hedberg, Swedish ice hockey goaltender
John Hedberg, (1840–1916) Finnish forester, journalist and politician
Karl Olov Hedberg, Swedish botanist
Lara Hedberg Deam, American Magazine publisher and founder of architecture and design magazine Dwell 
Mitch Hedberg (1968–2005), American stand-up comedian 
Olle Hedberg (1899–1974), Swedish author
Peter Hedberg (born 1990), Swedish politician
Randy Hedberg, American college football coach and a former professional football player
Reinhold Hedberg (1862–1922), Finnish Lutheran clergyman and politician
Rolf Hedberg, Swedish Bandy player
Sami Hedberg, Finnish stand up comedian and actor
Stina Hedberg, Swedish actress
Thomas Hedberg, British sailor and Olympic Champion

See also
20282 Hedberg, main-belt asteroid
Hedberg Maps, map publishing company based in Minneapolis, Minnesota

Swedish-language surnames